Utelle is a commune about  northeast of Nice in the Alpes-Maritimes department in southeastern France.

Geography
It is perched on a hill along the Vesubie Gorge not far from the Mercantour National Park.

Sights
Formerly an agricultural village planted with numerous olive trees, the village is near the Madonne d'Utelle, a chapel that serves as an annual pilgrimage site for local Catholics.  In their 1997 book "The Templar Revelation," Lynn Picknett and Clive Prince mention (on pg. 82) "the old Templar town of Utelle, whose medieval houses still bear the esoteric sigils of the alchemists..." It is one of sixteen villages grouped together by the Métropole Nice Côte d'Azur tourist department as the Route des Villages Perchés (Route of Perched Villages). The others are: Aspremont, Carros, Castagniers, Coaraze, Colomars, Duranus, Èze, Falicon, La Gaude, Lantosque, Levens, La Roquette-sur-Var, Saint-Blaise, Saint-Jeannet and Tourrette-Levens.

Population

See also
Communes of the Alpes-Maritimes department

References

External links
  & (Occitan) Chimes from County of Nice : tirignoun (chime) from Utelle.

Communes of Alpes-Maritimes
Alpes-Maritimes communes articles needing translation from French Wikipedia